Ralf König (born 8 August 1960) is one of the best known and most commercially successful German comic book creators.  His books have been translated into many languages.  He has resided in Soest, Dortmund and Berlin and now lives in Cologne.

Biography 
After attending a German Hauptschule, König completed an apprenticeship, learning the trade of a joiner.

In 1979, he came out as a gay man, and about this time he created short comics stories that appeared in the Munich underground magazine Zomix and the gay periodical Rosa Flieder.  He returned to school from 1981 to 1986, attending the public Kunstakademie Düsseldorf and pursuing a major in free art (Freie Kunst). Also in 1981, his early collected comics were published by the gay publishing house Verlag rosa Winkel as SchwulComix (GayComix). In 1987, he wrote The Killer Condom (Kondom des Grauens), his first comic with a continuous story, which was later produced as a film.

In the German-speaking world, König's comics have a vast homosexual fan base.  Despite initial skepticism about the prospect of a broader audience due to his works' frequent setting within the gay milieu, his comics have achieved considerable popularity among heterosexual readers as well.  A few of his comics have been adapted into films, and several have translated into other languages.  By 2008, his total publications exceeded 5 million copies.
Since November 2017, König is an Ambassador of intaktiv e.V., an association against ritual circumcision of male children.

Works

König's stories are drawn in an expressive cartoon style. Consistently written with humour, they occasionally deal with serious themes such as the tension between sexual freedom and the risk of AIDS infection. His work has repeatedly portrayed daily routines of gay life, often based on personal experiences of himself and his friends.  He has also written works that deal centrally with heterosexuals (Der bewegte Mann, Hempels Sofa) and with religious themes, criticizing literalist readings of the bible (Prototyp and Archetyp) as well as Islamic fundamentalism (Dschinn Dschinn) .

Comics 
 Sarius, 1981
 Das sensationelle Comic-Book, 1981
 SchwulComix (Gay Comics), 1981
 SchwulComix 2 (Gay Comics 2), 1984
 Macho Comix (Macho Comix), 1984
 SchwulComix 3 (Gay Comics 3), 1985
 SchwulComix 4 (Gay Comics 4), 1986
 Kondom des Grauens (The Killer Condom), 1987
 Der bewegte Mann (Maybe...Maybe Not), 1987
 Lysistrata, 1987
 Pretty Baby, 1988 (Maybe...Maybe Not Again!, sequel to Der bewegte Mann)
 Comics, Cartoons, Critzeleien, 1988
 Safere Zeiten (Safer Times), 1988
 Beach Boys, 1989
 Prall aus dem Leben (Life to the Full), 1989
 Bis auf die Knochen (To the Bones), 1990 (sequel to Kondom des Grauens)
 Heiße Herzen (Flaming Hearts), 1990 (with Detlev Meyer)
 Zitronenröllchen (Lemon cake), 1990
 Schwulxx-Comix (Gay Comix), 1990 (with Walter Moers)
 Deutsche Tuntenpost, 1991
 Bullenklöten! (Bull's Balls), 1992
 ...und das mit links!, 1993
 Konrad und Paul, 1993
 Konrad und Paul 2, 1994
 Konrad und Paul 3, 1997
 Jago, 1998
 Superparadise, 1999 (sequel to Bullenklöten)
 Poppers! Rimming! Tittentrimm!, 2001
 Wie die Karnickel (like bunnies), 2002
 Sie dürfen sich jetzt küssen, 2003 (Third part of Bullenklöten)
 Suck my duck, 2004
 Roy und Al, 2004
 Dschinn Dschinn: Der Zauber des Schabbar, 2005
 Dschinn Dschinn 2: Schleierzwang im Sündenpfuhl, 2006
 Trojanische Hengste, 2006
 Hempels Sofa, 2007
 Stutenkerle, 2008
 Prototyp, 2008
 Archetyp, 2009
 Antityp, 2010
 Der Dicke König, 2011
 Elftausend Jungfrauen, 2012
 Herbst in der Hose, 2017
 Santa Claus Junior, 2017
 Stehaufmännchen, 2019

Films
 Der bewegte Mann, 1994
 Kondom des Grauens, 1996 (script by Ralf König)
 Wie die Karnickel, 2002 (script by Ralf König)
 Lisístrata, Spain 2002 (following Lysistrata)

English translations
Some of König's books have been translated into English.  First was Kondom des Grauens, published as The Killer Condom (1991, reprint 2009). The two-part book Der bewegte Mann/Pretty Baby appeared as Maybe... Maybe Not (1998)/Maybe... Maybe Not Again! (1999). Later translations include Bullenklöten as Bull's Balls (2002), Roy und Al as Roy & Al (2006) and Down to the Bone (2011).

Documentary
A 2012 German documentary film directed by Rosa von Praunheim named König des Comics follows König's life and work. Besides König, those interviewed include Hella von Sinnen, Ralph Morgenstern, Joachim Król as well as friends and admirers of the cartoonist, like a Swiss fan who visits his beloved writer, a couple of friends who played important roles during König's youth, a comic book seller etc. The film also includes clips from König's comic public readings. It was screened at various festivals such as Berlin, Buenos Aires, and San Sebastian. It reached a wider audience than most of von Praunheim's documentaries and it is available for streaming on digital platforms.

Awards
 Joop Klepzeiker Prijs, 1988
 Best German comic creator, Grenoble, 1990
 Max-und-Moritz Prize, 1992
 Best International Comic Creator, Barcelona, 1992
 Bundesfilmpreis for the movie Der bewegte Mann, 1995
 Goldene Leinwand mit Stern for the movie Der bewegte Mann, 1995
 Goldener RIK, Köln, 2002
 Zivilcourage-Preis des Berliner CSD, Berlin, 2004
 Prix Alph’Art, Angoulême, 2005
 Premio miglior storia lunga, 2005
 Max-und-Moritz Prize, 2006
 Max-und-Moritz Prize, 2010

References
 Ralf König publications from Goethe-Institut
Footnotes

External links
 Ralf König official site 
 Ralf König biography on Lambiek Comiclopedia

1960 births
People from Soest, Germany
German comics artists
German comics writers
Living people
LGBT comics creators
German gay artists
Kunstakademie Düsseldorf alumni
German male writers